Aheripur is a village in the Etawah district of Uttar Pradesh, India. The population was 6,411 at the 2011 Indian census. It  has a very old Shri Bihariji Intercollege and numerous private and government primary schools.

References

Villages in Etawah district